Sandecja Nowy Sącz is a Polish football club formed in 1910.

In the 2016–17 season, Sandecja won I liga, which promoted the club to the Polish Ekstraklasa, Poland's highest professional football league, for the first time in the club's history.

Stadium

Up to 1979 Sandecja stadium was named XXV years of PRL at the initiative of the then Communist leaders of the city. In 1998, nine years after the fall of communism in Poland, it was then renamed in honor of Father Władysław Augustynek, a popular local Catholic priest, who was a passionate fan of the club.

History 
Sandecja was founded in 1910, upon the initiative of Adam Bieda, who was the chairman of the Nowy Sącz branch of the Sokol Sports Association. The name of the club comes after Latin name of the city of Nowy Sącz (Nova Civitas Sandecz), and from the very beginning, Sandecja was supported by the local Zakłady Naprawcze Taboru Kolejowego (Rail Rolling Stock Repair Workshops). For most of its history, Sandecja was closely associated with Polish Railroads, and its official name was Rail Sports Club Sandecja (since 1999: Municipal Sports Club Sandecja).

Throughout the years, Sandecja had several departments, including men’s and women’s volleyball (1950 - 2009), handball (1950 – 1955), basketball (1950 – 1961), track and field (1945 – 1970), skiing (1945 – 1956), ice-hockey (1951 – 1964), boxing (1948 – 1960), table tennis (1945 – 1955).

Timeline  

 1910 - Adam Bieda of the local Sokol Movement found the club, 
 1912 - the statutes of Sandecja are approved: “The purpose of the Club is to promote physical development of the youth”, 
 1914-1918 - World War I. Most players serve in the Austro-Hungarian Army, 
 August 1921 - Sandecja returns, 
 1924 - the club has 230 members in several departments, 
 1928-1932 - the club suspends its activities, due to the loss of its own field, 
 1933 - new field and new gym are opened, and with new manager, Franciszek Krupski of Polish Railways, Sandecja returns as Rail Club of Military Training Sandecja, 
 1934-1939 - the football team plays in the second and third levels of Polish football system (Class A, against KS Moscice, KSZO Ostrowiec Świętokrzyski, WKS Kielce, Azotania Jaworzno, Riflemen Association Chełmek, and a number of teams from Kraków. 
 1939-1945 - during World War II, the athletes of Sandecja are involved in conspirational activities of the Home Army (AK) and other organizations. Football player Julian Zubek commanded the largest AK unit in the area. Klemens Gucwa, Leopold Kwiatkowski, Jan Freisler and Roman Stramka serve as couriers,
 February 1945 - Sandecja returns. First postwar game took place on April 15, 1945: KS OMTUR Sandecja beats RKS Swit 2:1, 
 May 30, 1946 – Sandecja loses 0:17 to Cracovia,
 1966 - Sandecja wins promotion to the Third League 
 1967 – women’s volleyball team becomes the regional champion, 
 May 1, 1970 - at the newly opened stadium, located at Kilinskiego Street, international U-19 friendly Poland vs. Hungary takes place. Poland loses 2:3, and among Polish players were Kazimierz Kmiecik, Mirosław Bulzacki, Zbigniew Plaszewski, Jerzy Kraska. The game was attended by 10 000 people, 
 July 1978. Sandecja’s U-19 team becomes the fourth team in Poland, 
 June 1986. Sandecja wins promotion to the Second Division. In its first home game (August 1986), Sandecja beats 3-1 Broń Radom, but after one year, the team is relegated back to the Third Division (only 10 points in 30 games, with goal difference 19-52), 
 June 1992. Sandecja again wins promotion to the Second League, to be again relegated after one year (19 points in 34 games, goal difference 27-54). 
 1998 - Sandecja’s U-17 team finishes in the fourth position in Polish Championship, 
 June 27, 1999 - Sandecja is renamed into Municipal Sports Club, MKS, 
 June 2009. Sandecja, managed by Jarosław Araszkiewicz, once again is promoted to the Second Division.
 May 2017 - Sandecja, managed by Radosław Mroczkowski, is promoted to the Ekstraklasa (top tier of Polish professional league) for the first time in its history.

Achievements 

 I liga:
Winner (1): 2016–17

Current squad

Notable players
Had international caps for their respective countries.
Players marked in bold have had caps while playing for Sandecja.
 David Manoyan (2018)
 Charlie Trafford (2017)
 Giorgi Merebashvili (2022)
 Tomasz Brzyski (2017–2018)
 Mateusz Cetnarski (2017–2018)
 Michał Gliwa (2016–2018)
 Dawid Janczyk (2004–2005, 2016)
 Maciej Małkowski (2015–)
 Rudolf Urban (2010, 2014–2015)
 Pavlo Ksyonz (2018)

In addition, Marek and Piotr Świerczewski, who played for Sandecja in their youth career but not their senior career, had international caps for Poland (the latter won 70 of them).

References 

 History of Sandecja Nowy Sącz. Retrieved 27/11/2015

External links

 Sandecja official website (Polish)
 Sandecja at the 90minut.pl  website (Polish)

 
Football clubs in Poland
Football clubs in Nowy Sącz
Association football clubs established in 1910
1910 establishments in Poland
1910 establishments in Austria-Hungary
Railway association football clubs in Poland